Elvis Meleka (born 19 April 1986) is a Zimbabwean football defender.

References

1986 births
Living people
Zimbabwean footballers
Shooting Stars F.C. (Zimbabwe) players
Masvingo United F.C. players
Gunners F.C. players
Mochudi Centre Chiefs SC players
Gilport Lions F.C. players
Hwange Colliery F.C. players
Zimbabwe international footballers
Association football defenders
Zimbabwe Premier Soccer League players
Zimbabwean expatriate footballers
Expatriate footballers in Botswana
Zimbabwean expatriate sportspeople in Botswana
Zimbabwe A' international footballers
2011 African Nations Championship players